Mark Russell (born 1971) is an American author, cartoonist, and comic book writer.

Books 

Russell is the author of God Is Disappointed in You (Top Shelf Productions, 2013), a modern re-telling of the Bible (with cartoons by New Yorker cartoonist Shannon Wheeler) as well as a follow up book about non-canonical Christian and Jewish texts called Apocrypha Now (Top Shelf Productions/IDW, 2016).

Comics 

In 2015, Russell made his debut in comics with his critically acclaimed reboot of the 1973–74 comic Prez (Issues 1–6, DC Comics), drawn by Ben Caldwell, in which a teenager is elected and serves as President of the United States. Following Prez, Russell was hired to write The Flintstones comic book series for DC Comics, drawn by Steve Pugh. The Flintstones was nominated for two Eisner Awards, including Best Limited Series and Best Humor Publication, as well as being nominated for a Harvey Award for Book of the Year. In 2018, DC Comics published Russell's comic Exit, Stage Left!: The Snagglepuss Chronicles, which reinvented the titular Hanna Barbera character as a gay southern gothic playwright living in 1950s New York. Exit Stage Left!: The Snagglepuss Chronicles won the 2019 GLAAD Award for Outstanding Comic. The series was also nominated for the Eisner Award for Best Limited Series and Russell was nominated for the Eisner Award for Best Writer. February 2019 saw the publication of Russell's The Wonder Twins with artist Stephen Byrne as part of DC's new Wonder Comics line, curated by Brian Michael Bendis, which was nominated for a 2020 Ringo award for Best Humor Comic. 2019 also saw the publication of Russell's comic Second Coming by Ahoy Comics. Originally slated to be published by DC/Vertigo, the comic was dropped by the label due to the religious and controversial subject matter, only to be later picked up and published by Ahoy. Volume I of Second Coming was published in March 2020, featuring an Introduction by Patton Oswalt. A second series of Second Coming was released starting in December 2020. Russell's acclaimed satirical comic Billionaire Island, also released in 2020, reunited him with Flintstones artist Steve Pugh. In 2021, Russell wrote Fantastic Four: Life Story for Marvel, which retells the story of the first family of Marvel in a decade-by-decade format. 2021 also saw the release of his title One-Star Squadron, drawn by artist Steve Lieber, about declining superheroes who are forced to make a living in the marketplace, and Not All Robots with artist Mike Deodato, which won the 2022 Eisner Award for Best Humor Publication. In 2022, DC Comics released Superman: Space Age, written by Mark Russell with art by Mike Allred, to critical acclaim.

Other comic book titles written by Mark Russell include a Red Sonja series for Dynamite Comics, Judge Dredd: Under Siege (IDW, 2018), The Lone Ranger: The Devil's Rope (Dynamite, 2018) and Superman vs Imperious Lex (DC, 2021).

Personal life 

Mark Russell was born in Springfield, Oregon and currently lives in Portland, Oregon with his wife and family.

Miscellaneous 

In the late 1990s and early 2000s, Russell self-published his stories and cartoons in a zine called The Penny Dreadful.

In 2019, Russell appeared on an episode of Storytellers Telling Stories with Jude Brewer, recounting his early days on Public Access Television.

In November 2020, Russell appeared on an episode of Indie Comics Spotlight with Tony Farina & Mike Burton on the podcast feed Comics In Motion, discussing Billionaire Island and Second Coming.

On September 16, 2021, Mark Russell appeared on a YouTube channel called "Lost'n Comics", where he discussed his comic origin story, his ongoing career and current work.

References

External links
DC Comics
 Eaglesport

1971 births
Living people
Place of birth missing (living people)
American cartoonists